Yuxarı Xocamsaqlı (also, Yukhary Khojamsagly or Yukhary Khojamusakhly) is a village in the Qubadli Rayon of Azerbaijan.

References 

Populated places in Qubadli District